Rabbi Yehuda Sarna is the Chief Rabbi of the Jewish Council of the Emirates.  He is also the Executive Director of the Bronfman Center for Jewish Student Life at New York University (NYU), the University Chaplain and an Adjunct Assistant Professor of Public Administration at the Robert F. Wagner Graduate School of Public Service.

Biography 
Rabbi Yehuda Sarna was born in Montreal, Canada. He attended Yeshivat Har Etzion from 1995 to 1997 before earning his B.A. in English Literature and Judaic Studies from Yeshiva College.  Rabbi Sarna is a 2003 graduate of the Rabbi Isaac Elchanan Theological Seminary. In 2002, he began working at New York University's Bronfman Center for Jewish Student Life, a Hillel affiliate. Since then, Rabbi Sarna has founded the Jewish Learning Fellowship, a 10-week experiential, conversational seminar for students looking to deepen their understanding of Judaism on their own terms. He has been instrumental in building a strong and diverse Jewish presence at NYU.

Rabbi Sarna, along with Imam Khalid Latif, co-founded the 'Of Many' Institute for Multifaith Leadership at NYU. They teach a course together and lead service trips to cultivate cooperation and dialogue among students from different faiths.

Chief Rabbi of the Jewish Council of the Emirates 
In 2019, Rabbi Sarna was appointed Chief Rabbi of the Jewish Council of the Emirates (JCE).

Rabbi Sarna lives in New York and used to visit the United Arab Emirates 4 times a year until the onset of the Covid pandemic.

Press

Op-Eds 
Rabbi Yehuda Sarna, "Chief Rabbi of UAE: Reflections on a Historic Accord", Jewish Exponent, Sept. 17, 2020.

Rabbi Yehuda Sarna, "How I Became Chief Rabbi of the UAE and Why That Matters", Times of Israel, Aug. 21, 2020.

Notable Mentions 
Dan Lavie, "A year on, Abraham Accords depict new chapter in region's history", Israel Hayom, Oct. 4, 2021.

Binsal Abdulkader, "'Muslim woman who stood guard Jewish prayer at AUH airport embodies UAE's tolerance:' Chief Rabbi", Emirates News Agency, Sept. 16, 2021.

"'Amen-Amen-Amen': New documentary tells the story of the UAE's first Jewish community", The National, Dec. 15, 2020.

Aviva Engel, "UAE's Chief Rabbi Yehuda Sarna: The pride of Montreal's Jewish Community", The Suburban, Sept.17, 2020.

David Brooks, "From One Chief Rabbi to Another", Jewish Insider, June 27, 2019.

Ron Kampeas, "NYU Chaplain to Be First Chief Rabbi in the United Arab Emirates", Haaretz, May 15, 2019.

Awards and recognition 
Rabbi Sarna has received numerous awards for his work. In 2009, he was an honoree at the Jewish Learning Initiative on Campus Awards dinner.  Additionally in 2009, he was listed as one of the "36-under-36" by The Jewish Week. In 2012, Rabbi Sarna received an award from Temple of Understanding with NYU's Imam Khalid Latif and Chelsea Clinton for their work in, "advancing a new model of integrating interfaith and cross cultural education into campus life." In 2013, he was honored by Yeshivat Har Etzion as "Alumnus of the Year."

Personal life 
Rabbi Sarna is married to psychologist Dr. Michelle Waldman Sarna. They have 6 children.

See also 

 Elie Abadie
 Levi Duchman
 Yousef Al Otaiba
John Sexton

References

American Modern Orthodox rabbis
New York University people
Yeshiva University alumni
Yeshivat Har Etzion
New York University faculty
Jewish chaplains
Year of birth missing (living people)
Emirati rabbis
Chief rabbis
Living people
21st-century American Jews